Antonio Pigafetta (– c. 1531) was a Venetian scholar and explorer. He joined the expedition to the Spice Islands led by explorer Ferdinand Magellan under the flag of the emperor Charles V and after Magellan's death in the Philippine Islands, the subsequent voyage around the world. During the expedition, he served as Magellan's assistant and kept an accurate journal, which later assisted him in translating the Cebuano language. It is the first recorded document concerning the language.

Pigafetta was one of the 18 men who made the complete trip, returning to Spain in 1522, under the command of Juan Sebastián Elcano, out of the approximately 240 who set out three years earlier. These men completed the first circumnavigation of the world. Others mutinied and returned in the first year. Pigafetta's surviving journal is the source for much of what is known about Magellan and Elcano's voyage.

At least one warship of the Italian Navy, a destroyer of the Navigatori class, was named after him in 1931.

Early life
Pigafetta's exact year of birth is not known, with estimates ranging between 1480 and 1491. A birth year of 1491 would have made him around 30 years old during Magellan's expedition, which historians have considered more probable than an age close to 40. Pigafetta belonged to a rich family from the city of Vicenza in northeast Italy. In his youth he studied astronomy, geography and cartography. He then served on board the ships of the Knights of Rhodes at the beginning of the 16th century. Until 1519, he accompanied the papal nuncio, Monsignor Francesco Chieregati, to Spain.

Voyage around the world

In Seville, Pigafetta heard of Magellan's planned expedition and decided to join, accepting the title of supernumerary (that exceeds the number) and a modest salary of 1,000 maravedís. During the voyage, which started in August 1519, Pigafetta collected extensive data concerning the geography, climate, flora, fauna and the native inhabitants of the places that the expedition visited. His meticulous notes proved valuable to future explorers and cartographers, mainly due to his inclusion of nautical and linguistic data, and also to latter-day historians because of its vivid, detailed style. The only other sailor to maintain a journal during the voyage was Francisco Albo, Victoria's last pilot, who kept a formal logbook.

Return

Pigafetta was wounded on Mactan in the Philippines, where Magellan was killed in the Battle of Mactan in April 1521. Nevertheless, he recovered and was among the 18 who accompanied Juan Sebastián Elcano on board the Victoria on the return voyage to Spain.

Upon reaching port in Sanlúcar de Barrameda in the modern Province of Cadiz in September 1522, three years after his departure, Pigafetta returned to the Republic of Venice. He related his experiences in the "Report on the First Voyage Around the World", which was composed in Italian and was distributed to European monarchs in handwritten form before it was eventually published by Italian historian Giovanni Battista Ramusio in 1550–59. The account centers on the events in the Mariana Islands and the Philippines, although it included several maps of other areas as well, including the first known use of the word "Pacific Ocean" (Oceano Pacifico) on a map. The original document was not preserved.

However, it was not through Pigafetta's writings that Europeans first learned of the circumnavigation of the globe. Rather, it was through an account written by a Flanders-based writer Maximilianus Transylvanus, which was published in 1523. Transylvanus had been instructed to interview some of the survivors of the voyage when Magellan's surviving ship, Victoria, returned to Spain in September 1522 under the command of Juan Sebastian Elcano. After Magellan and Elcano's voyage, Pigafetta utilized the connections he had made prior to the voyage with the Knights of Rhodes to achieve membership in the order.

The Relazione del primo viaggio intorno al mondo 

Antonio Pigafetta also wrote a book, in which a detailed account of the voyage was given. 

Although the text is written in semi-chronological order, it does not read as a linear history of the voyage. Rather, it is a collection of descriptions, events, translations of foreign languages, thoughts, and illustrations. The resulting work is therefore described as being unusually personal for the times. 

It is unclear when it was first published and what language had been used in the first edition, given that the original text was lost, though it is believed that it might have been written in the author's Venetian dialect, mixed with Spanish and Italian.  The remaining sources of his voyage were extensively studied by Italian archivist Andrea da Mosto, who wrote a critical study of Pigafetta's book in 1898 (Il primo viaggio intorno al globo di Antonio Pigafetta e le sue regole sull'arte del navigare) and whose conclusions were later confirmed by J. Dénucé.

Today, three printed books and four manuscripts survive. One of the three books is in French, while the remaining two are in the Italian language. Of the four manuscripts, three are in French (two stored in the Bibliothèque nationale de France and one in Cheltenham), and one in Italian.

From a philological point of view, the French editions seem to derive from an Italian original version, while the remaining Italian editions seem to derive from a French original version. Because of this, it remains quite unclear whether the original version of Pigafetta's manuscript was in French or Italian, though it was probably in Italian.
The most complete manuscript, and the one that is supposed to be more closely related to the original manuscript, is the one found by Carlo Amoretti inside the Biblioteca Ambrosiana, Milan and published in 1800 (Primo viaggio intorno al globo terraqueo, ossia ragguaglio della navigazione alle Indie Orientali per la via d'Occidente fatta dal cavaliere Antonio Pigafetta patrizio vicentino, sulla squadra del capitano Magaglianes negli anni 1519-1522). Unfortunately, Amoretti, in his printed edition, modified many words and sentences whose meaning was uncertain (the original manuscript contained many words in Veneto dialect and some Spanish words). The modified version published by Amoretti was then translated into other languages carrying into them Amoretti's edits. Andrea da Mosto critically analyzed the original version stored in the Biblioteca Ambrosiana and published this rigorous version of Pigafetta's book in 1894.

Regarding the French versions of Pigafetta's book, J. Dénucé extensively studied them and published a critical edition.

At the end of his book, Pigafetta stated that he had given a copy to Charles V.  Pigafetta's close friend, Francesco Chiericati, also stated that he had received a copy and it is thought that the regent of France may have received a copy of the latter. It has been argued that the copy Pigafetta had provided may have been merely a short version or a draft. It was in response to a request, in January 1523, of the Marquis of Mantua that Pigafetta wrote his detailed account of the voyage.

Works 
Antonio Pigafetta wrote at least two books, both of which have survived:
 Relazione del primo viaggio intorno al mondo (1524-1525);
 Regole sull'arte del navigare (1524-1525) (contained in ).

Exhibition 
In June 2019, in the context of the quincentenary of the circumnavigation, an exhibition entitled Pigafetta: cronista de la primera vuelta al mundo Magallanes Elcano opened in Madrid at the library of the Spanish Agency for International Development Cooperation (AECID). AECID was also involved in the publication of a book about the expedition La vuelta al mundo de Magallanes-Elcano : la aventura imposible, 1519-1522.

References

Sources
Lord Stanley of Alderley, The first voyage round the world, by Magellan, London: The Hakluyt Society (1874) - includes Pigefetta's journal and his treatise of navigation.
Magellan's Voyage around the World by Antonio Pigafetta – The original text of the Ambrosian ms. translated by James Alexander Robertson, Cleveland : The Arthur H. Clark Company (1906); Vol 1, Vol. 2, Vol. 3

Salonia, Matteo. (2022). Asian Ceremonies and Christian Chivalry in Pigafetta’s The First Voyage around the World. In C.Mueller and M. Salonia (eds.), Travel Writings on Asia: Curiosity, Identities, and Knowledge across the East, c. 1200 to the Present (pp. 83–110).

External links

 

1491 births
1531 deaths
16th-century Italian historians
16th-century explorers
Authors of Spanish ethnographic accounts of the Philippines in the 16th century
Circumnavigators of the globe
Explorers from the Republic of Venice
Italian chroniclers
Italian explorers of South America
Italian explorers of the Pacific
Knights of Malta
Magellan expedition
People from Vicenza